The greater spot-nosed monkey or putty-nosed monkey (Cercopithecus nictitans) is one of the smallest Old World monkeys. It is a guenon of the C. mitis group, native to West Africa and living to some extent in rain forests, but more often in the transition zone between rain forest and savannah. It is primarily arboreal and often associates with monkeys of other species. Both their common names come from the monkeys' prominent white nose.

The greater spot-nosed monkey lives in groups consisting of one adult male, a number of adult females, and their dependent offspring. Little recent research has been conducted into its behaviour, and most has concentrated on its auditory communication. Males use three call types which have been described as 'booms', 'pyows', and 'hacks'. These are used in a number of contexts including as alarm calls.

As in some other species of monkeys, the acoustical structure of greater spot-nosed monkey alarm calls it has been argued to vary according to the kind of predator spotted. The monkey reportedly combines different sounds into a sequence, which has an entirely different meaning from the sounds out of which it is made.

References

External links

 Mammal species of the World: Cercopithecus nictitans

greater spot-nosed monkey
Mammals of Cameroon
Mammals of the Central African Republic
Mammals of the Democratic Republic of the Congo
Mammals of the Republic of the Congo
Mammals of Equatorial Guinea
Mammals of Gabon
Mammals of West Africa
Fauna of Central Africa
greater spot-nosed monkey
Taxa named by Carl Linnaeus